Sports Complex Meteor is the biggest center of sports and cultural live in Dnipro, Ukraine. The complex is a home to the Olympic and Paralympic teams of Ukraine with status national since October 10, 2001. Meteor belongs to the State Company "Production Union Southern Machine-building Factory of Makarov" (Yuzhmash) and Sports Club Meteor. Sports Club Meteor was established in 1962.

Composition

The complex includes:
 Stadium Meteor (1966)
 Palace of water sports Meteor (1970, main pool)
 Ice Palace of Sports Meteor (1980)
 Machine-builder water sports facility (1958) is located in a remote location (Shevchenko City Park, Monastyrskyi Island)

The Meteor is home to five sports schools four of which are the Olympic reserves and another one is a complex school that specialized in six sports.

SC Meteor Presidents
 1962–1982: Anatoliy Haiduk
 1982–1986: Yuriy Olkhovyk
 1986–2009: Konstantin Vavilov
 2009–present: Olga Dengina

Notable sports people
 Lyudmila Shevtsova – Olympian champion in athletics at the 1960 Summer Olympics – Women's 800 metres
 Yury Zaitsev – Olympian champion in weightlifting at the 1976 Summer Olympics
 Oksana Baiul – Olympian champion in figure skating at the 1994 Winter Olympics
 Yevhen Braslavets and Ihor Matviyenko – Olympian champions in sailing at the 1996 Summer Olympics – Men's 470

External links
 Official website

Sport in Dnipro
Sports venues in Dnipropetrovsk Oblast
Buildings and structures in Dnipro
Yuzhmash